Patrice Michelle "Pat" Donnelly (born April 30, 1950) is an American retired track and field athlete and actress, known primarily for hurdling.

Background
Donnelly was born in San Diego, California. She attended Grossmont College. She was a high school physical education teacher at St. Paul High School in Santa Fe Springs, CA.

In 1971, she was Miss La Mesa. After the 1976 Olympic Games she married shot putter Peter Shmock. After divorcing Shmock, she married sprinter Mark Lutz, ex-spouse of distance runner Francie Larrieu.

Career in hurdling
Once the fourth-ranked hurdler in the world, Donnelly set the college record for the women's 100 meter hurdles at 13.5 seconds in 1970.

She was on the 1975 All-America team for the 100 meter hurdles. At the 1975 Pan American Games she placed fourth.

Donnelly attended the 1976 Summer Olympics as a 100-meter hurdler for the United States, but was eliminated in the heats, missing the semi-final by only 0.01 sec.

Career in film
Donnelly's film debut was in the 1982 film Personal Best, wherein she played an Olympic pentathlete. She also served as a technical advisor on the film.  She also went on to play Danielle, the stern assistant coach in the 1986 movie American Anthem.

She helped Billy Crudup train for Without Limits (1998), a film about Steve Prefontaine's life.

References

External links 

 
 

1950 births
Living people
American female hurdlers
American film actresses
Olympic track and field athletes of the United States
Athletes (track and field) at the 1976 Summer Olympics
Pan American Games track and field athletes for the United States
Athletes (track and field) at the 1975 Pan American Games
Track and field athletes from San Diego
College women's track and field athletes in the United States
Grossmont College alumni
21st-century American women